Alveberg is a Norwegian surname. Notable people with the surname include:

Kjersti Alveberg (born 1948), Norwegian choreographer and dancer
Reidar Alveberg (1916–2004), Norwegian bobsledder 

Norwegian-language surnames